The United Kingdom Association of Building Preservation Trusts (established 1989) acts as the representative body for Building Preservation Trusts in the U.K. Membership is open to charities whose principal objective is to preserve historic buildings. There are around 300 BPTs in the United Kingdom but not all are members of the association.

In 2016 the Association rebranded as The Heritage Trust

Legal status 
The association is constituted as an unincorporated association and is a registered charity, number 1179050.

See also 
 Architectural Heritage Fund
 Belfast Buildings Preservation Trust
 Building Preservation and Conservation Trusts in the UK
 Somerset Buildings Preservation Trust

References

Further reading

External links 
 Official website.

Conservation in the United Kingdom
Building Preservation Trusts
Charities based in London
1989 establishments in the United Kingdom
Organizations established in 1989